Víctor Claudio José Pérez Varela (born 18 October 1954) is a Chilean lawyer and politician. He was Minister of Defense during the second government of the President Sebastián Piñera (2018–2022).

His spell at the Ministry of Defense was the most brief since 1973 during Salvador Allende's government. Likewise, he had to face the «Mapocho River Incident» where a youngman was pushed by a Carabineros (policeman) from the Pío Nono Bridge towards the surface of the stream, which generated an attempt from the opposition to impeach Pérez. Thus, Pérez decided resigning to his charge with the reason to avoid the impeachment.

References

External Links
 

1954 births
People from Santiago
Living people
Independent Democratic Union politicians
University of Concepción alumni
20th-century Chilean politicians
21st-century Chilean politicians
Chilean Ministers of the Interior
Senators of the LV Legislative Period of the National Congress of Chile